Birnin Kudu is a town and a Local Government Area in the south of Jigawa State, Nigeria, some 120 kilometres south-east of Kano. As of 2006 the town of Birnin Kudu had an estimated population of 419,800 and is the most populous local government in the state.

Birnin Kudu is an old historic city renowned for its rocks and drawings found in some of them dating to centuries before the colonisation of Northern Nigeria and establishment of Native Authority (NA). The city was an NA headquarters during the British rule and has been the capital of Birnin Kudu Local Government Area.

Birnin Kudu is the most populous local government in Jigawa state according to 2006 census, though the city experiences slow infrastructural development. It is also a city where Gwaram and Buji local government where separated from in 1996.

It is home to one of the oldest schools in northern Nigeria, Government College Birnin Kudu, from where many Northern Leaders and businessmen emerged including Alhaji Aliko dangote (richest man in Africa).

In recent politics, Birnin Kudu has produced two governors of Jigawa State (Alh Ali Sa'adu, first civilian governor of the state) and Alh Sule lamido, who was a Governor of jigawa state from 29 May 2007 to 29 May 2015.

Birnin Kudu has 11 political wards, namely Kantoga, Kangire, Kwangwara, Kiyako, Sundumina, Surko, Lafiya, Unguwar ƴa, Yalwan damai, Birnin Kudu, and Wurno.

Siraj Muhammad Kantoga is currently member representing Birnin Kudu in Jigawa state House of assembly, 2015 to date.

BIRNINKUDU ROCK ARTS AND PAINTINGS 
Birnin Kudu Rock Paintings was discovered in 1950-1955 in Birnin Kudu. It is notable as having a collection of ancient rock gongs which were used as musical instruments and warning bells

Birnin Kudu rock paintings are one of the fascinating proofs of ancient human civilization in Sub Saharan Africa. These paintings are reputed to be more than two millennia old, situated in the lush landscape of Northern Nigeria.

See also
Federal Medical Centre, Birnin Kudu

References

Local Government Areas in Jigawa State